The Big Valley is an American Western drama television series created by A.I. Bezzerides and Louis F. Edelman for ABC. The series is set on the fictional Barkley Ranch in Stockton, California, from 1876-1878.  The one-hour episodes follow the lives of the Barkley family, one of the wealthiest and largest ranch-owning families in Stockton. It premiered on September 15, 1965 and ended on May 19, 1969, with a total of 112 episodes over the course of 4 seasons.

Series overview
The series began with 1 hour episodes Wednesday nights, 9:00–10:00 on ABC. From Season 2 onward, it moved to Monday night, 10:00–11:00.

Episodes

Season 1 (1965–66)

Season 2 (1966–67)

Season 3 (1967–68)

Season 4 (1968–69)

References

External links
 
 
 Season 1 episodes at tvguide.com
 Season 2 episodes at tvguide.com
 Season 3 episodes at tvguide.com
 Season 4 episodes at tvguide.com

Lists of American Western (genre) television series episodes